An X-ray machine is any machine that involves X-rays. It may consist of an X-ray generator and an X-ray detector.

Examples include:
Machines for medical projectional radiography
Machines for computed tomography
Backscatter X-ray machines, used as "body scanners" in airport security
Detectors in X-ray astronomy

X-ray instrumentation